Coventry City Football Club is an English football club based in Coventry, West Midlands. The club was founded in 1883 and has competed in the English football league system since 1919. Their first and so far only season in major European cup competition came when they reached the second round of the Inter-Cities Fairs Cup in the 1970–71 season. They also took part in the Texaco Cup in the 1970s.

History

1970–71 Inter-Cities Fairs Cup
The Sky Blues''' maiden European voyage was the 1970–71 Inter-Cities Fairs Cup, which they took part in with fellow English clubs Newcastle United, Arsenal, Liverpool and eventual winners Leeds United. Coventry's first opponents were Bulgarian side Trakia Plovdiv. A 4–1 away win in which John O'Rourke scored a hat-trick was followed up with a 2–0 home win to send the English club through to face FC Bayern Munich. However, a 6–1 defeat at Grünwalder Stadion meant that a 2–1 win for Coventry in the second leg was not enough, and they were duly eliminated.

1971–72 Texaco Cup
Coventry entered the Texaco Cup for the first time in 1971–72 and faced Falkirk in the first round, and needed extra time to beat them, to set up a tie with Newcastle United. After a 1–1 draw at home, Coventry were roundly beaten 5–1 at St James' Park and exited the competition.

1972–73 Texaco Cup
Coventry's second Texaco Cup campaign was even more brief than the first as Motherwell beat Coventry in the second leg after a drawn first leg to send the West Midlands club out.

1973–74 Texaco Cup
Motherwell were again the first round opposition as Coventry embarked upon their third Texaco Cup tournament, and again the Lanarkshire club would frustrate them as wins home and away saw 'Well progress.

1985–91
English clubs were banned from taking part in European competition in the aftermath of the Heysel Stadium disaster in 1985. This affected the Sky Blues'' when they won the FA Cup in 1986–87. This achievement would normally be rewarded with a place in the 1987–88 European Cup Winners' Cup, however the ban meant they did not compete. The ban was in place until 1990–91, and England did not reacquire the full (pre-1985) number of places to award in European club competition until 1995–96. The FA Cup win coincided with an attempt to resurrect the Anglo-Scottish Cup in 1987–88 as the Anglo Scottish Challenge Cup. It saw Coventry pitted with 1986–87 Scottish Cup winners St Mirren, however poor attendances at the first leg (a 1–1 draw at Highfield Road) meant that the revival was halted, and the second leg was never played.

Overall record

Notes

References
 
 

Europe
Coventry City